Sowlan (also Romanized as Sowlān, Sowlon, and Sūlon) is a village in Chah Dadkhoda Rural District, Chah Dadkhoda District, Qaleh Ganj County, Kerman Province, Iran. At the 2006 census, its population was 571, in 137 families.

References 

Populated places in Qaleh Ganj County